El Capitan is a mountain in the western United States, in the Sawtooth Range of central Idaho.

References 

Mountains of Blaine County, Idaho
Mountains of Idaho
Sawtooth Wilderness